Judo South Africa (JSA) is the governing body of Judo in South Africa, and a member of the world governing body, the International Judo Federation (IJF), along with the African Judo Union. JSA is also a member of the South African Sports Confederation and Olympic Committee (SASCOC), which, alongside Sport and Recreation South Africa (SRSA) control all organised sport in South Africa.

History
Judo introduction into South Africa began in 1945 by soldiers of World War II. Alec Butcher, an immigrant from Britain was among the pioneers alongside Jack Robinson for Jujitsu. Judo established itself as a national sport in 1955 through the formation of the South African Amateur Judo Association (SAAJA)

Apart from SAAJA, a rival body led by Jack Robinson emerged called South African National Amateur Judo Association (SANAJA) (sometimes referred to as South African Amateur Judo and Jujitsu Association (SANAJJA)) which received recognition by the South African government, teaching a version of Kodokan Judo. During the late 1970s and the 1980s the sport was controlled at various times by a body made up of rival members from both SAAJA and SANAJA. This body was named the South African Judo Union (SAJU). In 1992, all judo organisations in South Africa united under one association now called Judo South Africa (JSA).

Structure
The national body has 14 provincial controlling bodies or associations. The main tournament organised is the annual South African Judo Championships.

Judoka

See also
 Sport in South Africa

References

External links
 Official website
 International Judo Federation Official website
 African Judo Union Official website

Judo
1955 establishments in South Africa
Sports organizations established in 1955
National members of the International Judo Federation
Judo in South Africa